EAS (Hellenic Defense Systems) is the company formed by the merger in 2004 of the Greek defence companies EBO and Pyrkal. When created, it was a major manufacturer with  thousands of employees, with a product range that included most land weapons in use today, as well as an established exporter to many countries in the world.

As of 2018 the company registered losses, partly due to the previous economic crisis that affected Greece from 2008 to 2018. A restructuring of the company started in 2019 and as of 2020 the future outlook of the company had improved, although many steps still remained necessary to assure its sustainability and growth.

Products
E56 120 mm Mortar

External links / References 
 Official Website
L.S. Skartsis, "Greek Vehicle & Machine Manufacturers 1800 to present: A Pictorial History", Marathon (2012)  (eBook)

Specific

Defence companies of Greece
Firearm manufacturers of Greece
2004 establishments in Greece
Government-owned companies of Greece
Greek brands
Companies based in Athens